The 2022 Oregon House of Representatives election was held on Tuesday, November 8, 2022. Primary elections were held on Tuesday, May 17, 2022. Voters in the 60 districts of the Oregon House of Representatives elected their representatives. The elections coincided with the elections for other offices, including for State Senate.

Background 
The Democratic Party had controlled the Oregon House of Representatives since 2007.

Retirements

Democrats
District 11: Marty Wilde retired.
District 21: Chris Hoy retired.
District 22: Teresa Alonso Leon retired to run for U. S. representative from Oregon's 6th congressional district.
District 27: Sheri Schouten retired.
District 28: Wlnsvey Campos retired to run for state senator from District 18.
District 37: Rachel Prusak retired.
District 38: Andrea Salinas retired to run for U. S. representative from Oregon's 6th congressional district.
District 40: Mark Meek retired to run for state senator from District 20.
District 41: Karin Power retired.
District 45: Barbara Smith Warner retired.
District 48: Jeff Reardon retired.
District 52: Anna Williams retired.

Republicans
District 4: Duane Stark retired.
District 7: Cedric Hayden retired to run for state senator from District 6.
District 19: Raquel Moore-Green retired to run for state senator from District 10.
District 24: Ron Noble retired to run for U. S. representative from Oregon's 6th congressional district.
District 25: Jessica George retired.
District 32: Suzanne Weber retired to run for state senator from District 16.
District 53: Jack Zika retired.
District 59: Daniel Bonham retired to run for state senator from District 26.

Incumbents defeated

In primaries

Democrats
District 19: Brad Witt lost renomination to Tom Andersen after being redistricted from District 31.

Predictions

Results summary

Close races
Districts where the margin of victory was under 10%:
 (gain)
 (gain)

 (gain)
 (gain)

Results by District

1st District

2nd District

3rd District

4th District

5th District

6th District

7th District

8th District

9th District

10th District

11th District

12th District

13th District

14th District

15th District

16th District

17th District

18th District

19th District

20th District

21st District

22nd District

23rd District

24th District

25th District

26th District

27th District

28th District

29th District

30th District

31st District

32nd District

33rd District

34th District

35th District

36th District

37th District

38th District

39th District

40th District

41st District

42nd District

43rd District

44th District

45th District

46th District

47th District

48th District

49th District

50th District

51st District

52nd District

53rd District

54th District

55th District

56th District

57th District

58th District

59th District

60th District

See also 
 2022 Oregon elections

References 

House of Representatives
Oregon House
2022